Kladruby is a town in Tachov District in the Plzeň Region of the Czech Republic. It has about 1,600 inhabitants.

Administrative parts
Villages of Brod u Stříbra, Láz, Milevo, Pozorka, Tuněchody and Vrbice u Stříbra are administrative parts of Kladruby.

Geography
It lies in the Plasy Uplands. The Úhlavka River flows through the town.

History
The Kladruby village was founded together with the Kladruby Monastery in 1115. Around 1233, a new royal town was founded by Wenceslaus I of Bohemia.

Transport
The D5 motorway passes through the municipal territory.

Culture
Since 1977, the Kladruby Summer Music Festival focused on classical music has been held in the premises of the Kladruby Monastery.

Sights

The Kladruby Monastery is a large Benedictine monastery founded in 1115 by Vladislaus I, Duke of Bohemia. Its vast late Baroque Church of the Assumption of the Virgin Mary (by architect Jan Santini Aichel) attests to the secular power and wealth of the monastery, which was dissolved under the regime of Joseph II.

Notable people
Ladislav Žemla (1887–1955), tennis player

References

External links

 
Official website of the monastery

Cities and towns in the Czech Republic
Populated places in Tachov District
Benedictine monasteries in the Czech Republic